Mentiras (English: "Lies") is a 1986 Mexican drama film directed by Abel Salazar and Alberto Mariscal and starring Lupita D'Alessio, Juan Ferrara and Jorge Ortiz de Pinedo.

Plot
A singer for commercials (D'Alessio) looking for her big break manages to attract the attention of a producer (Ferrara) while making friends with a down-on-his-luck musician (Ortiz de Pinedo). Falling in love and trouble seem inevitable.

Cast
Lupita D'Alessio as Lupita Montero
Juan Ferrara as Alvaro Ibáñez
Jorge Ortiz de Pinedo as Enrique Galván
Flor Procuna as Angélica
Rafael Amador
Humberto Elizondo as Don Gabriel
Diana Golden as Reporter (as Diana Gold)

Release
The film was released on cinemas for sixteen weeks.

Reception
Cinémas d'Amérique Latine said that the film "adorned itself with an aesthetic worthy of the most common of soap operas". Some reviews noted the film's feminist themes, with Debate feminista holding it as an example of a film that conveys a narrative of "feminidad odiahombres" ("man-hating femininity"), and Jorge Ayala Blanco in La disolvencia del cine mexicano: entre lo popular y lo exquisito saying of D'Alessio's character that "the fiery Lupita is a typically middle-class suburban phenomenon".

Some reviews also described the film as a star vehicle for Lupita D'Alessio, but that it failed in that task. Ayala Blanco said, "Mentiras becomes, within the Mexican residual cinema with massive prefabricated success, a television by-product whose primary function is the expansion (failed), extension (diminished), applause (deaf), translation to celluloid (vain), and reinforcement (tautological) of a character produced by TV that does not necessarily have to be operative outside its scope.", and Dicine magazine would refer to the film as "that mess called Mentiras with which Lupita D'Alessio tried to inject oxygen into her devalued career".

References

External links

1986 films
1980s Spanish-language films
Films directed by Abel Salazar
Mexican drama films
1986 drama films
1980s Mexican films